The Fred B. Dubach House is a historic house located at 7793 Annie Lee Street in Dubach, Louisiana.

Built c.1900 by Fred B. Dubach, founder of the town of Dubach, the house is a two-story frame residence in Queen Anne Revival-Colonial Revival style. In 1899 Fred B. Dubach founded the Dubach Lumber Company and his house was built shortly after, directly across the road from his lumber mill.

The house was listed on the National Register of Historic Places on September 8, 1983.

See also
 National Register of Historic Places listings in Lincoln Parish, Louisiana

References

Houses on the National Register of Historic Places in Louisiana
Houses completed in 1900
Queen Anne architecture in Louisiana
Colonial Revival architecture in Louisiana
Buildings and structures in Lincoln Parish, Louisiana
National Register of Historic Places in Lincoln Parish, Louisiana